Jichu Qullu (Also known as Aymara jichu ichu, Peruvian feather grass, qullu mountain, ichu mountain, or Ichocollo) is a mountain in the Andes of Peru that reaches a height of approximately . It is situated in the Arequipa Region, Caylloma Province, Chuca District.

References 

Mountains of Peru
Mountains of Arequipa Region